De Grote Sinterklaasfilm is a 2020 Dutch film directed by Lucio Messercola. The film won the Golden Film award after having sold 100,000 tickets. It was the tenth highest-grossing Dutch film of 2020.

It was Bram van der Vlugt's last appearance as Sinterklaas; the film was released two months before his death.

See also 
 De Grote Sinterklaasfilm: Trammelant in Spanje
 De Grote Sinterklaasfilm: Gespuis in de Speelgoedkluis

References

External links 
 

2020 films
2020s Dutch-language films
Dutch children's films
Sinterklaas films
Films shot in the Netherlands
Films directed by Lucio Messercola